Peter Kotte (born 8 December 1954) is a German former footballer.

He scored 54 goals in the Oberliga for Stahl Riesa and Dynamo Dresden in 166 matches.

Kotte won 21 caps for the East Germany national team from 1976 until 1980.

References

External links
 
 
 

1954 births
Living people
German footballers
East German footballers
East Germany international footballers
Association football forwards
Dynamo Dresden players
Dynamo Dresden non-playing staff
DDR-Oberliga players